The Onondaga people (Onondaga: , "Hill Place people") are one of the original five original nations of the Haudenosaunee (Iroquois) Confederacy in the Northeastern Woodlands. Their historical homelands are in and around present-day Onondaga County, New York, south of Lake Ontario. 

Being centrally located, they are considered the "Keepers of the Fire" ( in Tuscarora) in the figurative longhouse that shelters the Five Nations. The Cayuga and Seneca have territory to their west and the Oneida and Mohawk to their east. For this reason, the League of the Iroquois historically met at the Iroquois government's capital at Onondaga, as the traditional chiefs do today.

In the United States, the home of the Onondaga Nation is the Onondaga Reservation. Onondaga peoples also live near Brantford, Ontario on Six Nations territory. This reserve used to be Haudenosaunee hunting grounds, but much of the Confederacy relocated there as a result of the American Revolution. Although the British promised the security of Haudenosaunee homelands, the 1783 treaty of Paris ceded the territory over to the United States.

History
According to oral tradition, the Great Peacemaker approached the Onondaga and other tribes to found the Haudenosaunee. The tradition tells that at the time the Seneca nation debated joining the Haudenosaunee based on the Great Peacemaker's teachings, a solar eclipse took place. The most likely eclipse to be recounted was in 1142AD, which was visible to the people in the land of the Seneca.

This oral tradition is supported by archeological studies. Carbon dating of particular sites of Onondaga habitation shows dates starting close to 1200AD ± 60 years with growth for hundreds of years.

In the American Revolutionary War, the Onondaga were at first officially neutral, although individual Onondaga warriors were involved in at least one raid on American settlements.  After Americans attacked on their main village on April 20, 1779, the Onondaga later sided with the majority of the League and fought against the American colonists in alliance with the British.  After the United States was accorded independence, many Onondaga followed Joseph Brant to Upper Canada, where they were given land by the Crown at Six Nations.

On November 11, 1794, the Onondaga Nation, along with the other Haudenosaunee nations, signed the Treaty of Canandaigua with the United States, in which their right to their homeland was acknowledged by the United States in article II of the treaty.

In 1816, 450 Onondaga were living in New York, 210 of whom lived on Buffalo Creek Reservation.

Prestige factors 
The Onondaga Nation was crucial in forming the Iroquois League which led them to be very well revered by their peers. The "Tree of Peace" was planted on Onondaga Land. Onondaga has been regarded as the capital of Iroquois land. The Onondaga were known as the Central Fire-Keepers of the Confederacy. The Onondaga were known as the guardians or watchkeepers of the league. They were keepers of the law in order to preserve traditions and institutions. The culture hero Hyenwatha was an Onondaga Indian and was essential in the early organization of the league. The title of Tadodaho was always held by an Onondaga chief; he was to be the chief arbitrator of the Lords of the Confederacy. The Onondaga maintained the largest number chieftainship titles as well as the largest number of clans among the Iroquois. Handsome Lake, the Seneca half-brother of Cornplanter and author of his eponymous Code, died at Onondaga.

Customs 

The Onondaga practice the sprinkling of ashes when juggling the treatment of the sick. They also do a public confession of sins upon a string of wampum (shell beads). The wampum is employed in all matters of public importance. Their funerals were known to be quiet and solemn, with the women covering their faces. There were also special events such as the Planting Feast which would happen in May or when the Onondaga believed the ground was ready. This was three days for penitential and religious services. One day for the children's dance, and one each for the Four Persons, the Holder for the Heavens, the Thunder, and for gambling. The Strawberry Feast comes when the berries are ripe. This day there are dancing for the Thunder and a feast of strawberries. The Green Bean Dance comes when the green beans are fit for use. This day there are dances for the Thunder and a mixture of war and feather dances. The Green Corn dance always comes after the Green Bean dance. This day there are three days for religious services, one for the children, one for the Four Persons, one for the Holder of the heavens, and one for the Thunder with the feast. The Onondaga's Thanksgiving feast in October closely resembled the Green Corn Dance.

The Onondaga peoples place great emphasis on giving thanks, and this is reflected in their ceremonies. Ceremonial songs would be performed in the longhouse, and danced to in a counter-clockwise direction since this is the life-providing direction of Mother Earth, moon, and stars. The more spirited the singing and dancing, the more thanks is given to the Creator. The Onondaga peoples rely on the lunar calendar for their ceremonies that occur, and there are faith-keepers responsible for initiating the ceremonies based on the different moons.

Culture 
Some factors that defined pre-colonial Onondaga life were:

 a continued placement of villages on defensive high points away from rivers and the presence of defensive earthen embankments
 a gradual evolution of pottery vessels and smoking pipe forms and decorations
 a gradual evolution of stone and bone tools and implements
 continuity in subsistence systems
 continuity of house forms and inferred communal living
 the continued use of human face motifs
 evidence for bear ceremonialism and cannibalism

Government
The Onondaga in New York have a traditional form of government, with chiefs nominated by clan mothers, rather than elected. The Onondaga follow the Haudenosaunee matriarch clan system. Only an Onondaga woman can provide Onondaga children. Members of a clan are considered to be family, even if members in the clan are from different nations. When it comes to marriage, partners must be from outside the clan. Onondaga peoples believe it is their duty to help and support their clan in tough times, sickness, and death.

They hoped to obtain increased influence over environmental restoration efforts at Onondaga Lake and other EPA Superfund sites in the claimed area. The Court of Appeals for the Second Circuit rejected the Onondagas' claim in 2012, and the Supreme Court in 2013 declined to hear an appeal.

On June 29, 2022, 1,023 acres of land were returned to the Onondaga Nation.

Sports 
The Onondaga very much enjoyed sports and physical activity. Lacrosse and foot races were always known to be favorites of the Onondaga people. They also adopted many games from European settlers such as mumble the peg, marbles, some games of ball, pull away, and fox and geese in the snow. Hide and seek and blindman's bluff were played but no games with song.

Notable people

 Leon Shenandoah (1915–1996), Tadodaho
 Oren Lyons (Lives at Onondaga and holds a Faithkeeper title, but is Seneca)
 Tom Longboat (Six Nations)
 Canassatego, Hiawatha, Tadadaho of the Iroquois Confederacy
 Tadodaho Sidney Hill
 Samuel George, (or 'Great Wolf'), (1795–1873; chief from 1850 to 1873)
Madge Skelly (1903–1993), actress, director, speech pathologist
Lyle Thompson (professional lacrosse player) (born 1992)
 Tonya Gonnella Frichner lawyer and activist (1947–2015)
 Eric Gansworth (poet, novelist and visual artist)
 Erik J. Sorensen (chemist)

Today
 Onondaga Nation south of Nedrow, New York outside Syracuse
 Onondaga of Ohswegen and Bearfoot Onondaga, both at Six Nations of the Grand River, Ontario, Canada

Other spellings encountered
 Onöñda'gega, Onondaga language
 Onontakeka, Oneida language
 Onondagaono, Seneca language

See also
Onondaga language
HMCS Onondaga (S73) Oberon Class submarine
Sainte-Marie among the Hurons
John Arthur Gibson

Notes

References 
Onondaga Reservation, New York United States Census Bureau

External links
 Onondaga Nation, official website

 
 
Iroquois
Indigenous peoples of the Northeastern Woodlands
Native American history of New York (state)
Native American tribes in New York (state)
Ethnic groups in Syracuse, New York
History of Broome County, New York
History of Onondaga County, New York
Native Americans in the American Revolution